The 1956 FIVB Men's World Championship was the third edition of the tournament, organised by the world's governing body, the FIVB. It was held from 30 August to 12 September 1956 in Paris, France.

Teams

No qualifications, free entrance.

Pool A
 
 
 

Pool B
 
 

Pool C
 
 

Pool D
 
 

Pool E
 
 

Pool F
  (Host)
 
 

Pool G
 
 

Pool H
 
 
 

Pool I
 
 
 

Pool J

Results

First round

Pool A

|}

|}

Pool B

|}

|}

Pool C

|}

|}

Pool D

|}

|}

Pool E

|}

|}

Pool F

|}

|}

Pool G

|}

|}

Pool H

|}

|}

Pool I

|}

|}

Pool J

|}

|}

Final round

21st–24th places

|}

|}

11th–20th places

|}

|}

|}

|}

|}

|}

|}

|}

|}

|}

Final places

|}

|}

|}

|}

|}

|}

|}

|}

|}

|}

Final standing

External links
 Results at FIVB.org
 Federation Internationale de Volleyball

W
V
V
FIVB Volleyball Men's World Championship
Volleyball in Paris